Accident Investigation Bureau may refer to:

 Accident Investigation Bureau (Nigeria), a Nigerian government agency
 Aircraft Accident Investigation Bureau (India), an Indian government agency
 Air Accident Investigation Bureau of Singapore, a Singaporean government agency
 Aircraft Accident Investigation Bureau (Switzerland), a former Swiss government agency

See also 
 Accident Investigation Board (disambiguation)
 Accident Investigation Branch (disambiguation)
 Aircraft Accident Investigation Bureau (disambiguation)